Silenced (English: "The Crucible") is a 2011 South Korean crime drama film based on the novel The Crucible by Gong Ji-young, directed by Hwang Dong-hyuk and starring Gong Yoo and Jung Yu-mi. It is based on events that took place at Gwangju Inhwa School for the Deaf, where young Deaf students were the victims of repeated sexual assaults by faculty members over a period of five years in the early 2000s.

Depicting both the crimes and the court proceedings that let the teachers off with minimal punishment, the film sparked public outrage upon its September 2011 release, which eventually resulted in a reopening of the investigations into the incidents. With over 4 million people in Korea having watched the film, the demand for legislative reform eventually reached its way to the National Assembly of South Korea, where a revised bill, dubbed the Dogani Bill, was passed in late October 2011 to abolish the statute of limitations for sex crimes against minors and disabled people.

Plot
Kang In-ho is the newly appointed art teacher at Benevolence Academy, a school for Deaf children in the fictional city of Mujin, North Jeolla Province. He has a dark past: His wife committed suicide a year ago, and his sick daughter is under the care of his mother. He is excited to teach his new students, yet the children are aloof and distant, trying to avoid running into him as much as possible. In-ho does not give up trying to show the kids that he cares. When the students finally open up, In-ho faces the shocking and ugly truth about the school: the students have been secretly enduring physical and sexual abuse by the teachers and administration.

In-ho decides to fight for the children's rights and expose the crimes being committed at the school and collaborates with human rights activist Seo Yoo-jin, but In-ho and Yoo-jin soon realize the school's principal and teachers, and even the police, prosecutors and churches in the community are actually trying to cover up the truth. In addition to using "privileges of former post", the accused unhesitatingly lie and bribe their way to get very light sentences. Using their last night of freedom to go out partying, the Lee brothers are last seen laughing that the judge was so easy to pay off for a light sentence.

As Park (one of the sexually offensive teachers) leaves the party and walks home, he bumps into Min-su (one of the victims) along the way. Attempting to force the boy to come to his home to be raped once more, Park is shocked when Min-su stabs him in the side with a knife, having fallen into despair from his lost chance to put Park away for good. Park brushes off the stabbing and smacks Min-su to the ground, viciously beating and kicking the boy, proclaiming he will kill him. As he prepares to finish Min-su off, Park is overpowered by the boy, who flings both of them onto a nearby railroad track. As an oncoming train barrels toward them, the screaming Park is held down by Min-su with the help of the stab wound. Ultimately, the train runs over both of them, with Min-su refusing to let the rapist escape with his sickening inhuman acts.

Later, In-ho, Yeondoo and Yoori are seen mourning Min-su's death in a tent. A group of protesters and activists are seen demonstrating, when police attempt to disperse them. However, since most are deaf-mute, they continue unaware, forcing police towards forced dispersal using water cannons. As the clash plays out, In-ho stands amid the chaos carrying a picture of Min-su, repeatedly chanting, "Everyone! This boy could neither hear nor speak. This child is called Min-su," before he is apprehended by the police. The movie ends with the words of Yoo-jin's email updating In-ho about the lost appeal and the improving children's condition.

Cast

Impact
The film sparked public outcry over lenient court rulings, prompting police to reopen the case and lawmakers to introduce bills for the human rights of the vulnerable. Four out of the six teachers at the Gwangju Inhwa School for whom serious punishment was recommended by the education authority were reinstated after they escaped punishment under the statute of limitations. Only two of them were convicted of repeated rapes of eight young students and received jail terms of less than a year. 71-year-old ex teacher Kim Yeong-il recently claimed that two children had died when the incident took place in 1964, after which he was beaten and forced to resign his job by the vice principal. Two months after the film's release and resulting controversy, Gwangju City officially shut down the school in November 2011. In July 2012, the Gwangju District Court sentenced the 63-year-old former administrator of Gwangju Inhwa School to 12 years in prison for sexually assaulting an 18-year-old student in April 2005. He was also charged with physically abusing another 17-year-old student who had witnessed the crime (the victim reportedly attempted to kill themselves afterward). The administrator, only identified by his surname Kim, was also ordered to wear an electronic anklet for 10 years following his release.

In 2011, the Korean National Assembly passed the "Dogani Law" (named after the Korean name of the film), removing any statute of limitations for sexual assault against children under 13 and disabled people. It also raised the maximum sentence for rape of young children and disabled people to up to life in prison, and abolished a clause requiring that victims prove they were "unable to resist" due to their disability.

Reception

In Korea the film ranked No. 1 for three consecutive weeks and grossed  in its first week of release and grossed a total of  after ten weeks of screening.

After the film's release, the bestselling book of the same name by author Gong Ji-young, which first recounted the crimes and provided the bulk of the film's content, topped national bestseller lists for the first time in two years. Ruling conservative political party Grand National Party (GNP) then called for an investigation into Gong Ji-young for engaging in "political activities", a move that was met with public derision.

It received the Audience Award at the 2012 Udine Far East Film Festival in Italy.

Conversations about the film and its impact re-emerged when the Samsung Economic Research Institute (SERI) released its annual survey of the year's top ten consumer favorites on December 7, 2011. Based on a poll of market analysts and nearly 8,000 consumers, SERI's "Korea's Top Ten Hits of 2011" ranked Silenced among the year's top events.

Awards and nominations

International release
The film's international title is Silenced. On November 4, 2011, the film was released in select theaters in Los Angeles, San Jose, Huntington Beach, New Jersey, Philadelphia, Atlanta, Dallas, Chicago, Seattle, Portland, Las Vegas, Toronto and Vancouver. It has been reviewed by The Wall Street Journal, The Economist and The New York Times. In 2019, the film was released on Netflix.

See also
 Cinema of Korea
 List of South Korean films
 Gwangju Inhwa School

References

External links 
  
  
 
 

2011 films
2011 crime drama films
South Korean crime drama films
South Korean legal films
South Korean courtroom films
Films about educators
Films about education
Films set in schools
Films about child abuse
Films about sexual abuse
Films about child sexual abuse
Films about pedophilia
Films about deaf people
Korean Sign Language films
2010s Korean-language films
Films shot in Incheon
Films shot in Daejeon
Crime films based on actual events
Films based on South Korean novels
CJ Entertainment films
South Korean films based on actual events
2010s South Korean films